The Cherokee County Courthouse is a historic courthouse in Murphy, North Carolina, United States, the county seat of Cherokee County, that is listed on the National Register of Historic Places (NRHP).

Description

The courthouse is located at the corner of Central and Peachtree Streets. The Classical Revival building, built in 1926 to a design by James J. Baldwin, was the second built on the site. The prior courthouse on the site burned twice, but after the second fire was not salvageable. The blue marble-faced two story building has a five-bay diagonal section facing the roadway that forms its entrance. It has a four-columned Corinthian Greek portico, and is topped by a monumental cupola which rises well above the structure.  All the blue marble used for the construction was quarried locally from area mines. The building interior, especially its courtroom, has retained much of its original woodwork and stone styling. The courthouse underwent a substantial remodel around 2011, which modernized the interior, but in turn cost the building some of its original interior features. The remodel also added additional court rooms, and offices to the rear section of the building. The old Cherokee County Jail which was built in 1922 was demolished in order to make room for the new addition. The copper lantern which sits atop the dome, was removed around 2017 to make crucial repairs to the lantern. It was in danger of collapsing in on itself, due to structural deterioration over the years, as well as being riddled with bullet holes. The lantern was restored locally with help from The Cherokee County Board of Commissioners, the Cherokee County Maintenance Department,  Tri-County Community College Welding Department, as well as numerous other skilled local residents. 

Cherokee county has a list of former courthouses, either destroyed by fire, or replaced by improved models. The first courts in the county were held at Fort Butler, which was constructed as a holding area for the native Cherokee people during the Trail of Tears. Around 1840 Archibald Russell Spence Hunter, who was a prominent merchant, and first postmaster in the area, had the first brick courthouse constructed on the current public square. It was burned down in 1865 by raiders, right after the Civil War had ended. The third was built of brick as well, two stories, and square in its design, the county quickly outgrew this courthouse. A forth courthouse was built on the site of the current marble courthouse on Peachtree Street, down the street from the traditional public square where previous courthouses sat. It was also constructed of brick, had a clock tower, offices on the first floor, and a courtroom on the second. It was constructed in the early 1890s, and burned twice, finally being demolished after the second fire. The fifth, and final building sits on the foundations of the former 1890s courthouse.

The courthouse was listed on the NRHP May 10, 1979.

See also

 National Register of Historic Places listings in Cherokee County, North Carolina

References

External links

Cherokee County Courts

Courthouses on the National Register of Historic Places in North Carolina
Neoclassical architecture in North Carolina
Government buildings completed in 1926
Buildings and structures in Cherokee County, North Carolina
County courthouses in North Carolina
National Register of Historic Places in Cherokee County, North Carolina